Vermentino is a light-skinned wine grape variety, primarily found in Italian wine. It is widely planted in both Sardinia and Liguria, to some extent in Corsica, in Piedmont under the name Favorita, and in increasing amounts in Languedoc-Roussillon. The leaves are dark green and pentagonal. The grapes are amber-yellow and hang in pyramidal bunches. The vines are often grown on slopes facing the sea where they can benefit from the additional reflected light. The Vitis International Variety Catalogue now gives Italy as its origin.

The most famous wine made from Vermentino is probably the DOCG Vermentino di Gallura (and Vermentino di Gallura Superiore) which is produced in the province of Olbia-Tempio, in the north of Sardinia. The grape is said to have been cultivated in this part of Gallura, often under the name Arratelau, since the fourteenth century. Elsewhere on the island the grape is used for a variety of white wines, including sweet and sparkling variants.

Origin
Different hypotheses about the origin of Vermentino have been forwarded, and only recently has DNA typing confirmed Vermentino to be identical to the Pigato of Liguria and Favorita of Piedmont, superseding some earlier hypotheses. It is unclear if Vermentino is also identical to the variety Rollo found in eastern Provence, around Nice. Both that variety and Vermentino go under the synonym Rolle.

Wines

Italian DOC wines include:
Vermentino Di Sardegna (province of Sardinia)
Riviera Ligure di Ponente Vermentino (provinces of Imperia and Savona, Liguria)
Colli di Luni Vermentino (province of La Spezia in Liguria and the adjacent Tuscan province of Massa-Carrara)
Candia dei Colli Apuani (province of Massa-Carrara, Tuscany)
Bolgheri Vermentino (province of Livorno, Tuscany)
Colli del Limbara IGT (Sardinia), blended with Retagliado bianco

French wine AOC wines include:
Patrimonio, located in the north of Corsica, in the Saint Florent gulf, was the first region of the island to attain AOC status (in 1968). Its white wine is 100% Vermentino. 
In Languedoc-Roussillon, it has recently been allowed into many AOC wines, including Côtes du Roussillon. 
In Provence, close to Nice, the grape is used for the AOC white wines of Bellet.
In Southern Oregon, it is being grown in the Applegate Valley AVA by Troon Vineyard.
In Southern Idaho, it is being grown in the Snake River Valley AVA by Famici Wine Company.

Synonyms and confusion with other varieties
Vermentino is also known under the synonyms Agostenga, Agostenga blanc, Brustiano, Brustiano di Corsica, Carbes, Carbesso, Favorita, Favorita bianca, Favorita Bianca di Conegliano, Favorita d'Alba, Favorita di Alba, Favorita di Conegliano, Formentino, Fourmentin, Garbesso, Grosse Clarette, Malvasia a Bonifacio, Malvasia Grossa, Malvasie, Malvoisie, Malvoisie è Gros Grains, Malvoisie Corse, Malvoisie de Corse, Malvoisie Précoce d'Espagne, Piccabon, Piga, Pigato, Rolle, Rossese, Sibirkovski, Uva Sapaiola, Uva Vermentino, Valentin, Varlentin, Varresana bianca, Vennentino, Verlantin, Vermentini, Vermentino bianco, Vermentino Pigato, and Vermentinu.

Despite sharing several synonyms with Vermentino, the Corsican wine grape Brustiano bianco has no known relationship to the grape. Vermentino's exact relationship with the Tuscan grape Vermentino nero is not yet known though the variety may be a color mutation.

See also
List of Italian grape varieties

References

External links
  Italian DOC and DOCG wines using the vermentino grape from the website of the Italian Ministry of Agriculture and Forestry
  Italian IGT wines using the vermentino grape from the website of the Italian Ministry of Agriculture and Forestry
  History, viticulture, winemaking and flavors of Vermentino from the Tablas Creek Vineyard website

White wine grape varieties
Wine grapes of Italy
Wine of Sardinia